Cheyenne Westphal (born September 1967) is the chairman of auctioneers Phillips. She was worldwide head of contemporary art at Sotheby's until April 2016, having joined the firm in 1990.  Westphal joined Phillips as Chairman in 2017.

Westphal joined Phillips from Sotheby’s where she served as Worldwide Head of Contemporary Art. She led sales that resulted in world records for Gerhard Richter (Abstraktes Bild, $46.3 million), Sigmar Polke (Jungle, $27.1 million), Piero Manzoni (Achrome, $20.2 million), and Alberto Burri (Saccho e Rosso, $13.2 million), among many others. Westphal presided over every Sotheby’s contemporary sale in Europe since 1999, including the most successful contemporary art auction in Europe in July 2015, which achieved a record-breaking $204.7 million.

Westphal brought a number of single-owner collections to market, including the Damien Hirst sale, Beautiful Inside My Head Forever, which raised $200.7 million in 2008. This was followed by the $140 million Helga and Walther Lauffs Collection of Post-War European and American Art and The Lenz Schoenberg Collection in 2010, yielding £23 million and setting nineteen auction records, many for art from the ZERO movement. She negotiated the sale of CountDuerckheim's Post-War German Art in 2011, which raised a record $92.2 million and set records for German artists.

In 1990, Westphal joined Sotheby’s after graduating from St. Andrews Scotland and studying contemporary art under Professor Ann Wagner at UC Berkeley in California.

Cheyenne Westphal is currently on the board of the Whitechapel Galleries Venture Board and The Association for Women in the Arts.

References

Living people
Sotheby's people
20th-century German businesswomen
20th-century German businesspeople
1967 births
21st-century German businesswomen
21st-century German businesspeople